Palle may refer to

 Palle (given name)
 Palle (surname)

See also 

 Palli (disambiguation)